Casados con hijos may refer to:

 Casados con hijos (Argentine TV series), 2005–2006
 Casados con hijos (Colombian TV series), 2004–2006
 Casado con hijos (Chilean TV series), 2006–2008

See also
 Married... with Children